The 2012 New Zealand Derby was a horse race which took place at Ellerslie Racecourse on Saturday 3 March 2012. It was the 137th running of the New Zealand Derby, and it was won by Silent Achiever. Silent Achiever was the first filly to win the race in 19 years, and just the fourth since 1966. Silent Achiever gave trainer Roger James his fifth victory in the race.

Silent Achiever was still a maiden at the time early nominations for the Derby were taken. She was not nominated for the race, and neither her connections nor the public gave her any consideration as a Derby contender. But that all changed with an incredible series of stakes victories against males over the 2011/12 summer - the Group 2 Championship Stakes on January 1, the Group 3 Waikato Guineas on January 28 and the Group 2 Avondale Guineas on February 18. In these races Silent Achiever emphatically beat most other serious Derby contenders and established herself as the outright favourite for the race.

Silent Achiever was a little slow to begin in the Derby, and she was a long way off the pace for much of the race. But jockey James McDonald made a bold, sustained move around the outside of the field around the far turn, and Silent Achiever hit the lead soon after the field turned for home. She held her advantage strongly to the line, drawing away to beat 2000 Guineas winner Rock 'n' Pop by two and a half lengths.

Race details
 Sponsor: Telecom
 Prize money: NZ$750,000
 Track: Slow
 Number of runners: 16
 Winner's time: 2:33.55

Full result

Winner's details
Further details of the winner, Silent Achiever:

 Foaled: 18 September 2008 in New Zealand
 Sire: O'Reilly; Dam: Winning Spree (Zabeel)
 Owner: K J Hickman
 Trainer: Roger James
 Breeder: K J Hickman
 Starts: 7
 Wins: 5
 Seconds: 1
 Thirds: 1
 Earnings: $621,150

The road to the Derby
Early-season appearances in 2011-12 prior to running in the Derby.

 Silent Achiever – 3rd Eight Carat Classic, 1st Championship Stakes, 1st Waikato Guineas, 1st Avondale Guineas
 Rock 'n' Pop – 2nd Ray Coupland Stakes, 1st New Zealand 2000 Guineas, 1st Karaka Mile, 3rd International Stakes
 Carrick – 3rd Avondale Guineas
 Chicarita – 1st Royal Stakes, 6th Sir Tristram Fillies' Classic
 Zurella – 1st Eulogy Stakes, 5th Royal Stakes, 1st Sir Tristram Fillies' Classic
 Travolta – 4th Avondale Guineas
 Red Shift – No stakes races
 Roamin – 5th Avondale Guineas
 Shuka – 1st Ray Coupland Stakes, 2nd Canterbury Stakes, 5th New Zealand 2000 Guineas, 4th Great Northern Guineas, 2nd Championship Stakes, 3rd Waikato Guineas, 2nd Avondale Guineas
 Angelology – No stakes races
 Jeroboam – No stakes races
 Colorado Sun - 8th Avondale Guineas
 Barney - 3rd Championship Stakes Prelude, 6th Championship Stakes, 7th Waikato Guineas
 Guess What - 4th Waikato Guineas, 11th Avondale Guineas
 Nine Pin - No stakes races
 Mr Chez - 4th Geelong Classic, 11th Victoria Derby, 6th Avondale Guineas

Subsequent Group 1 wins
Subsequent wins at Group 1 level by runners in the 2012 New Zealand Derby.

 Silent Achiever - New Zealand Stakes, Ranvet Stakes, The BMW Stakes
 Shuka - Captain Cook Stakes

See also

 2019 New Zealand Derby
 2018 New Zealand Derby
 2017 New Zealand Derby
 2016 New Zealand Derby
 2015 New Zealand Derby
 2014 New Zealand Derby
 2013 New Zealand Derby
 2011 New Zealand Derby
 2010 New Zealand Derby
  Recent winners of major NZ 3 year old races
 Desert Gold Stakes
 Hawke's Bay Guineas
 Karaka Million
 Levin Classic
 New Zealand 1000 Guineas
 New Zealand 2000 Guineas
 New Zealand Oaks

New Zealand Derby
New Zealand Derby
2012 in New Zealand sport
March 2012 sports events in New Zealand